Ernest Sabella (born September 19, 1949) is an American actor and comedian. He is best known for his role as Pumbaa from The Lion King franchise, voicing the character in all media except the 2019 film. Sabella's TV roles include Mr. Donald "Twinkie" Twinkacetti in Perfect Strangers (1986-1987), George Shipman in A Fine Romance, and Leon Carosi in Saved by the Bell (1991). His work in Broadway theatre includes starring roles in Guys and Dolls, Curtains, and Man of La Mancha.

Life and career
Born in Westchester County, New York, Sabella graduated from the University of Miami, where he studied at the Department of Theatre Arts and performed at the university's Jerry Herman Ring Theatre.

His stage credits include The Robber Bridegroom (1976), Little Johnny Jones (1982), Guys and Dolls (1992) as Harry the Horse, A Funny Thing Happened on the Way to the Forum (1996), Chicago as Amos Hart (replacement), Man of La Mancha (2002, as Sancho Panza) and Sweet Charity (2005).

Film credits include Quiz Show (1994) as the car salesman, In & Out (1997) as Aldo Hooper, Disney's The Lion King (1994) and multiple sequels and spin-offs as Pumbaa. He also has worked with Nathan Lane, who had voiced Timon, in Guys and Dolls, Mouse Hunt, The Producers (in a deleted scene) and A Funny Thing Happened on the Way to the Forum. In the latter production, Sabella portrayed Marcus Lycus while Lane played Pseudolus. Sabella also joined Lane for his Saturday Night Live monologue, where they sang "Hakuna Matata".

On television, Sabella portrayed apartment manager Lou Donatelli in the Jason Bateman comedy It's Your Move (1984–85). He appeared in an episode of Cheers titled "Love Thy Neighbor" (Season Four Episode Eight air date November 21, 1985) in which he played the role of a private investigator named Santo Carbone, who was Carla Tortelli's cousin. He played store owner and landlord Donald Twinkacetti on Perfect Strangers (1986–1987). 
 He played Leo in the short-lived situation comedy Encore! Encore! starring Nathan Lane (2000). Sabella had a five-episode stint on Saved by the Bell in 1991 as Leon Carosi, an uptight resort manager and owner who employed the main cast's characters. Leah Remini was featured as his daughter. His other recurring roles include the lazy teacher Mr. Petrachelli on That's So Raven (2003), the floundering attorney Harland Bassett on The Practice (2000-2001), and characters on Newhart (1983).

In the Quantum Leap episode "Catch a Falling Star", he played the dual role of Manny, a stage actor, and Sancho Panza, Manny's character in a touring production of Man of La Mancha. Sabella had a brief appearance as a naked man on a subway train in a 1992 episode of Seinfeld titled "The Subway". 

He starred in a series of television commercials for NyQuil cold medicine in 1994 and was seen in a MasterCard commercial (2007), as well as Lynx in 2008.

Sabella co-starred as Sidney Bernstein in the Broadway musical comedy Curtains, which opened officially on March 22, 2007 and ran until June 29, 2008.

He played the role of apartment building superintendent Leon in the 9th episode "Hold Outs" of the 6th season (2015) of the CBS police procedural drama Blue Bloods.

In 2015, Sabella reprised his voice role as Pumbaa in the TV pilot movie The Lion Guard: Return of the Roar.

In 2016, Sabella became a full-time cast member for the Disney Junior television series The Lion Guard.

Personal life
Sabella met his wife Cheryl backstage during a Broadway performance of A Funny Thing Happened on the Way to the Forum in 1996; they married in 1999. His wife works as a computer programmer in their home town.

Filmography

Film

Television

Video games

Theme park attractions

Theatre

Awards and nominations
 1996 - Daytime Emmy Award - Outstanding Performer in an Animated Program - Nominated
 2005 - DVDX Award for Best Animated Character Performance (Voice and Animation in a DVD Premiere Movie) - Nominated

References

External links

1949 births
Living people
20th-century American male actors
21st-century American male actors
American male film actors
American male musical theatre actors
American male stage actors
American male television actors
American male video game actors
American male voice actors
Audiobook narrators
People from Mount Pleasant, New York
University of Miami alumni